Vaivari Station is a railway station on the Torņakalns – Tukums II Railway in the Vaivari neighbourhood of Jūrmala, Latvia. Vaivari is the terminal of the B ticket area.

Reconstruction controversy 
During the modernization a new modular station was built, a tree-covered building in which ticket sales will take place, and a toilet is also available.  At the time of modernization, the old building was demolished, the station building was moved and the old toilet was removed. The demolition of the old station building, and the replacement with metal containers, caused a great deal of indignation in society and in the media.

References

External links 

Railway stations in Latvia
Railway stations opened in 1927